Chaerophyllum aromaticum is a species of flowering plant belonging to the family Apiaceae.

Its native range is Central, Southeastern and Eastern Europe.

References

aromaticum